Viação Aérea Brasil S/A commonly known by its acronym Viabras was a Brazilian airline founded in 1946. In 1953 it was sold to Transportes Aéreos Nacional.

History
Viação Aérea Brasil – Viabras was founded on April 11, 1946 and on August 16 of the same year it was authorized to start services, which actually started only in March, 1947. It had a fleet of Douglas DC-3 aircraft and operated from Rio de Janeiro to locations in the states of Minas Gerais, Goiás and Mato Grosso. In 1949 Viabras started an operational agreement with Transportes Aéreos Nacional, which purchased the airline in 1953.

Destinations
In 1949 Viabras served the following cities:  
Belo Horizonte
Cuiabá
Goiânia
Rio de Janeiro
Rio Verde
Uberlândia

Fleet

Accidents and incidents

12 August 1952: a Douglas DC-3/C-47A-80-DL registration PP-ANH operated by Nacional en route from Rio Verde to Goiânia crashed following an in-flight bomb explosion at the location of Palmeiras de Goiás. All 24 passengers and crew died.

See also
List of defunct airlines of Brazil

References

Defunct airlines of Brazil
Airlines established in 1946
Airlines disestablished in 1953
1946 establishments in Brazil